Juan Francisco García Peña (born 1 October 1989), known as Juanfri, is a Spanish footballer who plays for Gibraltarian club Lincoln Red Imps as a striker.

Club career

Early years and Málaga
Born in Fuengirola, Province of Málaga, Juanfri made his senior debut at the age of just 16 with local club UD Fuengirola Los Boliches in the Tercera División, scoring a hat-trick in a 9–0 win against Úbeda CF. In the 2008–09 season he moved to another modest side in Andalusia, Unión Estepona CF, partnering former Málaga CF legend Catanha up front, and both were instrumental as they first promoted to Segunda División B; in the process, he netted the team's first-ever goal in the fourth tier of Spanish football.

Juanfri signed with Málaga in July 2009, being assigned to the reserves in division four. He made his first-team debut on 7 January 2010, in a 2–1 home defeat of Getafe CF in the round of 16 of the Copa del Rey.

Sporting Goa
Juanfri did not appear in any more competitive games for Málaga and, in summer 2012, left for neighbouring Écija Balompié in the third division. On 31 January 2013, however, he moved abroad and joined I-League franchise Sporting Clube de Goa until the end of the season.

Juanfri made his first appearance for his new team on 1 February 2013, being replaced in the 81st minute of the fixture against Churchill Brothers SC (1–0 home victory). He scored his first goal on 20 March, equalising an eventual 3–1 win at Salgaocar FC through a penalty.

In June 2013, Juanfri was released. He went on to resume his career in his country's lower leagues.

Later career
Early into the 2017 January transfer window, Juanfri left FC Saburtalo Tbilisi from Georgia and joined Tercera División club Antequera CF. On 3 August 2018, he signed for St Joseph's in Gibraltar, where he formed an efficient attacking partnership with his compatriot Salva Boro; in 2020, he led a list of Spanish players abroad by scoring 21 goals in a calendar year.

Career statistics

References

External links

1989 births
Living people
People from Fuengirola
Sportspeople from the Province of Málaga
Spanish footballers
Footballers from Andalusia
Association football forwards
Segunda División B players
Tercera División players
UD Fuengirola Los Boliches players
Atlético Malagueño players
Málaga CF players
Écija Balompié players
Marbella FC players
Antequera CF footballers
I-League players
Sporting Clube de Goa players
Erovnuli Liga players
FC Saburtalo Tbilisi players
Gibraltar Premier Division players
Gibraltar National League players
Lincoln Red Imps F.C. players
St Joseph's F.C. players
Spanish expatriate footballers
Expatriate footballers in India
Expatriate footballers in Georgia (country)
Expatriate footballers in Gibraltar
Spanish expatriate sportspeople in India
Spanish expatriate sportspeople in Georgia (country)
Spanish expatriate sportspeople in Gibraltar